The photophone is a telecommunications device that allows transmission of speech on a beam of light. It was invented jointly by Alexander Graham Bell and his assistant Charles Sumner Tainter on February 19, 1880, at Bell's laboratory at 1325 L Street in Washington, D.C. Both were later to become full associates in the Volta Laboratory Association, created and financed by Bell.

On June 3, 1880, Bell's assistant transmitted a wireless voice telephone message from the roof of the Franklin School to the window of Bell's laboratory, some 213 meters (about 700 ft.) away.

Bell believed the photophone was his most important invention. Of the 18 patents granted in Bell's name alone, and the 12 he shared with his collaborators, four were for the photophone, which Bell referred to as his "greatest achievement", telling a reporter shortly before his death that the photophone was "the greatest invention [I have] ever made, greater than the telephone".

The photophone was a precursor to the fiber-optic communication systems that achieved worldwide popular usage starting in the 1980s. The master patent for the photophone ( Apparatus for Signalling and Communicating, called Photophone) was issued in December 1880, many decades before its principles came to have practical applications.

Design

The photophone was similar to a contemporary telephone, except that it used modulated light as a means of wireless transmission while the telephone relied on modulated electricity carried over a conductive wire circuit.

Bell's own description of the light modulator:

The brightness of a reflected beam of light, as observed from the location of the receiver, therefore varied in accordance with the audio-frequency variations in air pressure—the sound waves—which acted upon the mirror.

In its initial form, the photophone receiver was also non-electronic, using the photoacoustic effect. Bell found that many substances could be used as direct light-to-sound transducers. Lampblack proved to be outstanding. Using a fully modulated beam of sunlight as a test signal, one experimental receiver design, employing only a deposit of lampblack, produced a tone that Bell described as "painfully loud" to an ear pressed close to the device.

In its ultimate electronic form, the photophone receiver used a simple selenium cell photodetector at the focus of a parabolic mirror. The cell's electrical resistance (between about 100 and 300 ohms) varied inversely with the light falling upon it, i.e., its resistance was higher when dimly lit, lower when brightly lit. The selenium cell took the place of a carbon microphone—also a variable-resistance device—in the circuit of what was otherwise essentially an ordinary telephone, consisting of a battery, an electromagnetic earphone, and the variable resistance, all connected in series. The selenium modulated the current flowing through the circuit, and the current was converted back into variations of air pressure—sound—by the earphone.

In his speech to the American Association for the Advancement of Science in August 1880, Bell gave credit for the first demonstration of speech transmission by light to Mr. A.C. Brown of London in the Fall of 1878.

Because the device used radiant energy, the French scientist Ernest Mercadier suggested that the invention should not be named 'photophone', but 'radiophone', as its mirrors reflected the Sun's radiant energy in multiple bands including the invisible infrared band. Bell used the name for a while but it should not be confused with the later invention "radiophone" which used radio waves.

First successful wireless voice communications

While honeymooning in Europe with his bride Mabel Hubbard, Bell likely read of the newly discovered property of selenium having a variable resistance when acted upon by light, in a paper by Robert Sabine as published in Nature on 25 April 1878. In his experiments, Sabine used a meter to see the effects of light acting on selenium connected in a circuit to a battery. However Bell reasoned that by adding a telephone receiver to the same circuit he would be able to hear what Sabine could only see.

As Bell's former associate, Thomas Watson, was fully occupied as the superintendent of manufacturing for the nascent Bell Telephone Company back in Boston, Massachusetts, Bell hired Charles Sumner Tainter, an instrument maker who had previously been assigned to the U.S. 1874 Transit of Venus Commission, for his new 'L' Street laboratory in Washington, at the rate of $15 per week.

On February 19, 1880, the pair had managed to make a functional photophone in their new laboratory by attaching a set of metallic gratings to a diaphragm, with a beam of light being interrupted by the gratings movement in response to spoken sounds. When the modulated light beam fell upon their selenium receiver Bell, on his headphones, was able to clearly hear Tainter singing Auld Lang Syne.

In an April 1, 1880, Washington, D.C., experiment, Bell and Tainter communicated some  along an alleyway to the laboratory's rear window. Then a few months later on June 21 they succeeded in communicating clearly over a distance of some 213 meters (about 700 ft.), using plain sunlight as their light source, practical electrical lighting having only just been introduced to the U.S. by Edison. The transmitter in their latter experiments had sunlight reflected off the surface of a very thin mirror positioned at the end of a speaking tube; as words were spoken they cause the mirror to oscillate between convex and concave, altering the amount of light reflected from its surface to the receiver. Tainter, who was on the roof of the Franklin School, spoke to Bell, who was in his laboratory listening and who signaled back to Tainter by waving his hat vigorously from the window, as had been requested.

The receiver was a parabolic mirror with selenium cells at its focal point. Conducted from the roof of the Franklin School to Bell's laboratory at 1325 'L' Street, this was the world's first formal wireless telephone communication (away from their laboratory), thus making the photophone the world's earliest known voice wireless telephone system,  at least 19 years ahead of the first spoken radio wave transmissions. Before Bell and Tainter had concluded their research in order to move on to the development of the Graphophone, they had devised some 50 different methods of modulating and demodulating light beams for optical telephony.

Reception and adoption

The telephone itself was still something of a novelty, and radio was decades away from commercialization. The social resistance to the photophone's futuristic form of communications could be seen in an August 1880 New York Times commentary:

However at the time of their February 1880 breakthrough, Bell was immensely proud of the achievement, to the point that he wanted to name his new second daughter "Photophone", which was subtly discouraged by his wife Mabel Bell (they instead chose "Marian", with "Daisy" as her nickname). He wrote somewhat enthusiastically:

Bell transferred the photophone's intellectual property rights to the American Bell Telephone Company in May 1880. While Bell had hoped his new photophone could be used by ships at sea and to also displace the plethora of telephone lines that were blooming along busy city boulevards, his design failed to protect its transmissions from outdoor interferences such as clouds, fog, rain, snow and such, that could easily disrupt the transmission of light. Factors such as the weather and the lack of light inhibited the use of Bell's invention. Not long after its invention laboratories within the Bell System continued to improve the photophone in the hope that it could supplement or replace expensive conventional telephone lines. Its earliest non-experimental use came with military communication systems during World War I and II, its key advantage being that its light-based transmissions could not be intercepted by the enemy.

Bell pondered the photophone's possible scientific use in the spectral analysis of artificial light sources, stars and sunspots. He later also speculated on its possible future applications, though he did not anticipate either the laser or fiber-optic telecommunications:

Further development

Although Bell Telephone researchers made several modest incremental improvements on Bell and Tainter's design, Marconi's radio transmissions started to far surpass the maximum range of the photophone as early as 1897 and further development of the photophone was largely arrested until German-Austrian experiments began at the turn of the 20th century.

The German physicist Ernst Ruhmer believed that the increased sensitivity of his improved selenium cells, combined with the superior receiving capabilities of professor H. T. Simon's "speaking arc", would make the photophone practical over longer signalling distances. Ruhmer carried out a series of experimental transmissions along the Havel river and on Lake Wannsee from 1901 to 1902. He reported achieving sending distances under good conditions of 15 kilometers (9 miles), with equal success during the day and at night. He continued his experiments around Berlin through 1904, in conjunction with the German Navy, which supplied high-powered searchlights for use in the transmissions.

They produced units commercially for the German Navy, which were further adapted to increase their range to  using voice-modulated ship searchlights.

British Admiralty research during WWI resulted in the development of a vibrating mirror modulator in 1916. More sensitive molybdenite receiver cells, which also had greater sensitivity to infra-red radiation, replaced the older selenium cells in 1917. The United States and German governments also worked on technical improvements to Bell's system.

By 1935 the German Carl Zeiss Company had started producing infra-red photophones for the German Army's tank battalions, employing tungsten lamps with infra-red filters which were modulated by vibrating mirrors or prisms. These also used receivers which employed lead sulfide detector cells and amplifiers, boosting their range to  under optimal conditions. The Japanese and Italian armies also attempted similar development of lightwave telecommunications before 1945.

Several military laboratories, including those in the United States, continued R&D efforts on the photophone into the 1950s, experimenting with high-pressure vapour and mercury arc lamps of between 500 and 2,000 watts power.

Commemorations

On March 3, 1947, the centenary of Alexander Graham Bell's birth, the Telephone Pioneers of America dedicated a historical marker on the side of one of the buildings, the Franklin School, which Bell and Sumner Tainter used for their first formal trial involving a considerable distance. Tainter had originally stood on the roof of the school building and transmitted to Bell at the window of his laboratory. The marker did not acknowledge Tainter's scientific and engineering contributions.

On February 19, 1980, exactly 100 years to the day after Bell and Tainter's first photophone transmission in their laboratory, staff from the Smithsonian Institution, the National Geographic Society and AT&T's Bell Labs gathered at the location of Bell's former 1325 'L' Street Volta Laboratory in Washington, D.C. for a commemoration of the event.

The Photophone Centenary commemoration had first been proposed by electronics researcher and writer Forrest M. Mims, who suggested it to Dr. Melville Bell Grosvenor, the inventor's grandson, during a visit to his office at the National Geographic Society. The historic grouping later observed the centennial of the photophone's first successful laboratory transmission by using Mims hand-made demonstration photophone, which functioned similar to Bell and Tainter's model.

The Bell Labs' Richard Gundlach and the Smithsonian's Elliot Sivowitch used the device at the commemoration to demonstrate one of the photophone's modern-day descendants. The National Geographic Society also mounted a special educational exhibit in its Explorer's Hall, highlighting the photophone's invention with original items borrowed from the Smithsonian Institution.

See also

Atomic line filter
Free-space optical communication
History of telecommunication
Laser microphone
Mie scattering
Modulating retro-reflector
Optical sound
Optical window
Photoacoustic effect
Radio window
Rayleigh scattering
Semaphore line
Visible light communication
Volta Laboratory and Bureau

References
 Footnotes 

 Citations 

 Bibliography 

Bell, A. G: "On the Production and Reproduction of Sound by Light", American Journal of Science, Third Series, Vol. XX, #118, October 1880, pp. 305–324; also published as "Selenium and the Photophone" in Nature, September 1880.
Bruce, Robert V Bell: Alexander Bell and the Conquest of Solitude, Ithaca, New York: Cornell University Press, 1990. .
Mims III, Forest M. The First Century of Lightwave Communications, Fiber Optics Weekly Update, Information Gatekeepers, February 10–26, 1982, pp. 6–23.
Grosvenor, Edwin S. and Morgan Wesson. Alexander Graham Bell: The Life and Times of the Man Who Invented the Telephone. New York: Harry N. Abrahms, Inc., 1997. .

Further reading
Chris Long and Mike Groth's optical audio telecommunications webpage
Ackroyd, William. "The Photophone" in "Science for All", Vol. 2 (R. Brown, ed.), Cassell & Co., London, circa 1884, pp. 307–312. A popular account, profusely illustrated with steel engravings.
Armengaud, J. " Le photophone de M.Graham Bell". Soc. Ing. civ. Mem., year 1880, Vol 2. pp. 513–522.
AT&T Company. "The Radiophone", pamphlet distributed at Louisiana Purchase Exhibition, St Louis, Missouri, 1904. Describes the photophone work of Hammond V Hayes at the Bell Labs (patented 1897) and the German engineer H T Simon in the same year.
Bell, Alexander Graham. "On the Production and Reproduction of Sound by Light: the Photophone". Am. Ass. for the Advancement of Sci., Proc., Vol 29., October 1880, pp. 115–136. Also in American Journal of Science, Series 3. No. 20, 1880, pp. 305–324; Eng. L., 30. 1880, pp. 240–242; Electrician, Vol 5. 1880, pp. 214–215, 220–221, 237; Journal of the Society of Telegraph Engineers, No. 9, 1880, pp. 404–426; Nat. L., Vol 22. 1880, pp. 500–503; Ann. Chim. Phys., Serie 5. Vol 21. 1880, pp. 399–430; E.T.Z., Vol. 1. 1880, pp. 391–396. Discussed at length in Eng. L., Vol 30. 1880, pp. 253–254, 407–409. In these papers, Bell accords the credit for the first demonstrations of the transmission of speech by light to a Mr A C Brown of London "in September or October 1878".
Bell, Alexander Graham. "Sur l'application du photophone a l'etude des bruits qui ont lieu a la surface solaire". C. R., Vol. 91. 1880, pp. 726–727.
Bell, Alexander Graham. "Professor A G Bell on Selenium and the Photophone". Pharm. J. and Trans., Series 3. Vol. 11., 1880–1881, pp. 272–276; The Electrician No 5, 18 September 1880, pp 220–221 and 2 October 1880 pp 237; Nature (London) Vol 22, 23 September 1880, pp. 500–503; Engineering Vol 30, pp 240–242, 253, 254, 407–409; and Journal of the Society of Telegraph Engineers Vol 9, pp 375–387.
Bell, Alexander Graham. "Other papers on the photophone" E.T.Z. No. 1, 1880, pp 391–396; Journal of the Society for the Arts 1880, No. 28, pp 847–848 & No. 29 pp 60–62; C.R. No. 91, 1880–1881, pp 595–598, 726, 727, 929–931, 982, 1882 pp 409–412, 450, 451, 1224–1227.
Bell, Alexander Graham. "Le Photophone De La Production Et De La Lumiere". Gauthier-Villars, Imprimeur-Libraire, Paris. 1880. (Note: this is item #26, Folder #4, as noted in "Finding Aid for the Alexander Graham Bell Collection, 1880–1925", Collection number: 308, UCLA Library, Department of Special Collections Manuscripts Division, as viewable at the Online Archive of California)
"Bell's Photophone". Nature Vol 24, 4 November 1880; The Electrician, Vol. 6, 1881, pp. 136–138.
Appleton's Journal. "The Photophone". Appleton's Journal, Vol. 10 No. 56, New York, February 1881, pp. 181–182.
Bidwell, Shelford. "The Photophone". Nature., 23. 1881, pp. 58–59.
Bidwell, Shelford. "Selenium and Its Applications to the Photophone and Telephotography". Proceedings of the Royal Institution (G.B.), Vol 9. 1881, pp. 524–535; The English Mechanic and World Of Science, Vol. 33, 22 April 1881, pp. 158–159 and 29 April 1881 pp. 180–181. Also in Chem. News, Vol. 44, 1881, pp. 1–3, 18–21. (From a lecture at the Royal Institution on 11 March 1881).
Breguet, A. "Les recepteurs photophoniques de selenium". Ann. Chim. Phys., Series 5. Vol 21. 1880, pp. 560–563.
Breguet, A. "Sur les experiences photophonique du Professeur Alexander Graham Bell et de M. Sumner Tainter": C.R.; Vol 91., 1880, pp 595–598.
Electrician. "Bell's Photophone", Electrician, Vol. 6, February 5, 1881, pp. 136–138,183.
Jamieson, Andrew. Nat. L., Vol. 10, 1881, p. 11. This Glasgow scientist seems to have been the first to suggest the usage of a manometric gas flame for optical transmission, demonstrated at a meeting of the Glasgow Philosophical Society; "The History of selenium and its action in the Bell Photophone, with description of recently designed form", Proceedings of the Philosophical Society of Glasgow No. 13, 1881, ***Moser, J. "The Microphonic Action of Selenium Cells". Phys. Soc., Proc., Vol. 4, 1881, pp. 348–360. Also in Phil. Mag., Series 5, Vol.12, 1881, pp. 212–223.
Kalischer, S. "Photophon Ohne Batterie". Rep. f. Phys., Vol. 17., 1881, pp. 563–570.
MacKenzie, Catherine "Alexander Graham Bell", Houghton Mifflin Company, Boston, p. 226, 1928.
Mercadier, E. "La radiophonie indirecte". Lumiere Electrique, Vol. 4, 1881, pp. 295–299.
Mercadier, E. "Sur la radiophonie produite a l'aide du selenium". C. R., Vol. 92,1881, pp. 705–707.
Mercadier, E. "Sur la construction de recepteurs photophoniques a selenium". C. R., Vol. 92, 1881, pp. 789–790.
Mercadier, E. "Sur l'influence de la temperature sur les recepteurs radiophoniques a selenium". C. R., Vol. 92, 1881, pp. 1407–1408.
Molera & Cebrian. "The Photophone". Eng. L., Vol. 31, 1881, p. 358.
Preece, Sir William H. "Radiophony", Engineering Vol. 32, 8 July 1881, pp. 29–33; Journal of the Society of Telegraph Engineers, Vol 10, 1881, pp. 212–228. On the photophone.
Rankine, A.O. "Talking over a Sunbeam". El. Exp. (N. Y.), Vol. 7, 1920, pp. 1265–1316.
Sternberg, J.M. The Volta Prize of the French Academy Awarded to Prof. Alexander Graham Bell: A Talk With Dr. J.M. Sternberg, The Evening Traveler, September 1, 1880, The Alexander Graham Bell Papers at the Library of Congress
Thompson, Silvanus P. "Notes on the Construction of the Photophone". Phys. Soc.Proc., Vol. 4, 1881, pp. 184–190. Also in Phil. Mag., Vol. 11, 1881, pp. 286–291. Abstracted in Chem. News, Vol. 43, 1881, p. 43; Eng. L., Vol. 31, 1881, p. 96.
Tomlinson, H. "The Photophone". Nat. L., Vol. 23, 1881, pp. 457–458.
U.S. Radio and Television Corp. "Ultra-violet rays used in Television", New York Times, 29 May 1929, p. 5: Demonstration of transmission of a low definition (mechanically scanned) video signal over a modulated light beam. Terminal stations 50 feet apart. Public demonstration at Bamberger and Company's Store, Newark, New Jersey. Earliest known usage of modulated light comms for conveying video signals. See also report "Invisible Ray Transmits Pictures" in Science and Invention, November 1929, Vol. 17, p. 629.
White, R.H. "Photophone". Harmsworth's Wireless Encyclopaedia, Vol. 3, pp. 1541–1544.
Weinhold, A. "Herstellung von Selenwiderstanden fur Photophonzwecke". E.T.Z., Vol. 1, 1880, p. 423.

External links

Bell's speech before the American Association for the Advancement of Science in Boston on August 27, 1880, in which he presented his paper "On the Production and Reproduction of Sound by Light: the Photophone".
Long-distance Atmospheric Optical Communications, by Chris Long and Mike Groth (VK7MJ)
Téléphone et photophone: les contributions indirectes de Graham Bell à l'idée de la vision à distance par l'électricité

Alexander Graham Bell
History of telecommunications
History of the telephone
Optical communications
Photonics